The 2006 IBF World Championships, the 15th tournament of the World Badminton Championships, was held in Madrid, the capital of Spain, from September 18 to 24, 2006.

Host city selection
Aarhus (Denmark) and Madrid (Spain) were the candidates for hosting the championships. During the 2004 IBF council meeting held in Jakarta, it was announced that Madrid will host the championships.

Venue 
 Palacio de Deportes de la Comunidad de Madrid

Medalists

Medal table

Events

References

External links 

Full results from tournamentsoftware.com

 
Badminton
World Championships
Sports competitions in Madrid
2006
Badminton tournaments in Spain
International sports competitions hosted by Spain
2006 in Madrid